Air Tahoma was an American cargo airline (Part 121)  based in Columbus, Ohio, United States. It was established and started operations in 1996 in San Diego then later moved to Indianapolis in 1998 and to its last location at Rickenbacker International Airport, Columbus. Air Tahoma operated contract cargo flights internationally to the Caribbean, Mexico, Vietnam, Philippines, and the United States. Air Tahoma ceased operations in 2009.

History
Noel Rude founded the company in 1996, and it operated out of Rickenbacker Airport in Columbus, OH

Air Tahoma is a spin-off of Cool Air Inc., which was founded in 1986 by Rude and his father, Bud Rude, a veteran of the airline industry who founded the parent company that originally flew firefighting missions in Washington.

FedEx contracted with Air Tahoma to fly to cities without enough traffic to support a larger jet.

Air Tahoma operated twin-engine turboprop Convairs (either the 580 or the 240).

On 13 August 2004 Flight 185 crashed during approach to landing.

Based on the Federal Aviation Administration (FAA)'s September 1, 2008 post accident inspection report, Air Tahoma was presented on Friday November 7, 2008 with a list of alleged discrepancies on each of its aircraft.  The company voluntarily suspended operations. On Monday, November 10, Air Tahoma presented the FAA with a 150-page document answering or dismissing every item in the FAA report.  Air Tahoma subsequently resumed operations and requested input from the FAA as to any known safety items so that they could be properly addressed. Assigned FAA inspectors told the carrier it was "business as usual," and their instructions were to continue their daily surveillance.

With no new information, the FAA issued an emergency revocation on January 13, 2009, citing many systemic violations of the Federal Aviation Regulations.

The Company appealed the revocation.  During the appeal process, the FAA revoked all ferry flights to reposition the company's aircraft to its home base and blocked any attempt by the company to place aircraft with other operators.  In exchange for dropping its appeal, the FAA allowed the company to move its aircraft home and agreed not to withhold necessary inspectors from other operators trying to lease Air Tahoma aircraft.

The Inspector General also conducted an investigation of Air Tahoma and its management personnel. As part of the investigation, two primary FAA officials with detailed knowledge of Air Tahoma stated:

"The First Inspector" read the FAA Enforcement Investigative Report (EIR) that was done after the fatal accident in September 2008; stated that, if that went to trial, 95% of the items within the EIR would be unsubstantiated.  Several issues documented in the EIR concerned NDT (non-destructive testing); declared that Air Tahoma contracted much of its NDT work to outside companies.

"The Second Inspector" read the FAA Enforcement Investigative Report (EIR) about Air Tahoma.  The EIR mentioned several issues with maintenance aspects and not many issues concerning operational item; stated that, if the maintenance items in the EIR were addressed individually in court, the items would not stand up.  Additionally, if Air Tahoma had the money to go to court, many aspects of the EIR would not have held-up; did not elaborate on those issues and his opinions. Although, stated agreed with the EIR, it appeared  "loaded on"; did not elaborate.

At the conclusion, the Special Agent In Charge (SAIC) briefed the Assistant United States Attorney (AUSA) about the information obtained, and the AUSA declined to prosecute the case.

Given that Air Tahoma successfully rebutted every item in the November 7, 2008 list of alleged aircraft discrepancies, and given that the FAA's own inspectors believed that the Enforcement Investigative Report against Air Tahoma would not hold up in court, it is easy to conclude why the FAA aggressively pressured Air Tahoma into dropping its appeal of the revocation order.

Destinations
Miami to Cancún to Mérida
Miami to Guatemala to San Pedro Sula
Subic Bay to Saigon
Aguadilla (Borinquen) to Port of Spain
San Juan to various other countries in the West Indies

Fleet 
The Air Tahoma fleet included the following aircraft (as of September 2007):

 1 - BAe 146-300
 3 - Convair CV-240
 8 - Convair CV-580

Incidents and accidents 
In October 2003, an Air Tahoma aircraft experienced an augmenter fire on the right engine after landing. The fire was contained in the augmenter (as designed) and no damage was sustained to the aircraft.
January 7, 2004, one of the Convair 580s en route to Memphis lost all oil pressure on the right engine while on approach to the Memphis airport.  The aircraft landed without incident. 
Air Tahoma Flight 185 crashed during approach to landing just 1 mile short of the runway at the Cincinnati/Northern Kentucky International Airport on the 13 August 2004.  The crash killed the First Officer Michael Ray Gelwicks and the Captain received minor injuries. NTSB ruled that the crash was due to a dual engine flameout as a result of the Captain being distracted with preflight planning during the flight, Captain didn't follow proper crossfeeding procedures, and Flight Crew didn't monitor the fuel gauges. There was sufficient fuel on board and nothing was wrong with the aircraft systems.
On September 1, 2008, an Air Tahoma Convair 580 crashed in Pickaway County, Ohio, shortly after taking off from Rickenbacker International Airport, claiming the lives of the 3 crew members. The FAA and NTSB investigated. The crash happened around the Noon hour.

See also 
 List of defunct airlines of the United States

References

External links 
Air Tahoma grounded by FAA
Article on Air Tahoma crashes and incidents
Columbus Dispatch Article Flight 587
Columbus Dispatch article 1/15/09
Aero-News Network article
Columbus Dispatch article 1/24/09
NTSB Preliminary Report
NTSB Probable Cause Report

Airlines established in 1995
Airlines disestablished in 2009
Companies based in the Columbus, Ohio metropolitan area
History of San Diego
History of Indianapolis
American companies established in 1995
American companies disestablished in 2009
1995 establishments in Ohio
2009 disestablishments in Ohio
Defunct airlines of the United States
Airlines based in Ohio